Hyphessobrycon bentosi, the Bentos tetra,ornate tetra, is a species of characin fish found in sluggish tributaries at the Amazon Basin in Brazil and Peru. Occasionally, it makes its way into the aquarium trade. It has often been confused with the rosy tetra.

Named in memory of a Colonel Bentos, who was a volunteer on the Thayer Expedition to Brazil (1865-1866), during which the type specimen was collected.

Description
The ornate tetra can grow up to 4 cm (1.6"). It is silvery pink, and has a dark spot around the gills, which distinguishes it from the rosy tetra. Its dorsal fin is black and has a white tip on it.  Males have longer dorsal and anal fins and appear slightly larger than females.

Distribution and habitat
The ornate tetra lives in sluggish tributaries of the Amazon River, associated flood plain lakes. It is a benthopelagic fish and is often found in creeks and around submerged vegetation.

Diet
It is an omnivorous fish that feeds on small invertebrates.

In the aquarium
Ornate tetras are kept in the aquarium hobby. Most individuals in the aquarium trade are bred commercially over collecting them in the wild. They have been sold as bentos tetras, white tip tetras, or false rosy tetras in certain stores.

References

Characidae
Tetras
Taxa named by Marion Durbin Ellis
Fish described in 1908